Events from the year 1676 in England.

Incumbents
 Monarch – Charles II
 Parliament – Cavalier

Events
 18 February – Isaac Newton observes to Robert Hooke that "If I have seen further it is by standing on the shoulders of giants".
 2 March – first performance of George Etherege's play The Man of Mode.
 26 May – fire in Southwark destroys 625 houses.
 September to November – major influenza epidemic; the first to be recorded as such.
 11 December – first performance of William Wycherley's play The Plain Dealer.

Undated
 Construction begins on Trinity College Library in Cambridge, designed by Sir Christopher Wren.
 The Royal Greenwich Observatory in London, designed by Wren, is completed this summer.
 Consecration of the first Greek Orthodox church in England, at Hog Lane, London.
 The first fossilised bone of what is now known to be a dinosaur is discovered by Robert Plot, the femur of a Megalosaurus from a limestone quarry at Cornwell near Chipping Norton.

Births
 4 January – Sir William Lowther, 1st Baronet, of Marske, Member of Parliament (died 1705)
 19 January – John Weldon, composer (died 1736)
 baptised 30 January – Charles Fane, 1st Viscount Fane, courtier and landowner (died 1744)
 14 June – Sir John Rogers, 2nd Baronet, lawyer and politician (died 1744)
 21 June (Old Style) – Anthony Collins, philosopher (died 1729)
 26 August – Robert Walpole, first Prime Minister of the United Kingdom (died 1745)
 14 November – Benjamin Hoadly, clergy (died 1761)
 29 November – Sir Henry Bunbury, 3rd Baronet, politician (died 1733)
 30 December – John Philips, poet (died 1709)

Deaths
 4 March – Sir Edward Turnour, Speaker of the House of Commons (born 1617)
 22 March – Lady Anne Clifford, literary patron (born 1590)
 23 May (bur.) – William Samwell, architect (born 1628)
 12 July – Henry Stubbe, writer and scholar (born 1632; drowned)
 10 September – Gerrard Winstanley, religious reformer (born 1609)
 11 October – Anthony Terill, theologian (born 1623)
 25 December –
 Matthew Hale, Lord Chief Justice (born 1609)
 William Cavendish, 1st Duke of Newcastle, soldier, politician and writer (born 1592)
 Chesten Marchant, last monoglot speaker of the Cornish language

References

 
Years of the 17th century in England